The African Cemetery at Higgs Beach is a cemetery in Key West, Florida where 294 of 1,342 Africans died soon in the first few months after being rescued in 1860 from captured slave ships. The cemetery was discovered in 2002 using ground-penetrating radar. On June 26, 2012, it was added to the National Register of Historic Places.

Gallery

References

External links
 

African-American history of Florida
Landmarks in Key West, Florida
History of Key West, Florida
National Register of Historic Places in Key West, Florida
Cemeteries on the National Register of Historic Places in Florida
2002 archaeological discoveries
1860s establishments in Florida 
African-American cemeteries